The Guatemala national rugby union team represents Guatemala in rugby union.

In December 2007, Guatemala participated in the First Central American Rugby cup. The other competing teams were Panama and Costa Rica A & B. Costa Rica A came first in this tournament, Panama 2nd, Guatemala 3rd, and Costa Rica B 4th. The team was captained by Josh Macy.

In December 2008, Guatemala participated in the Central American Tri Nations Cup hosted by Costa Rica. The other competing teams were Venezuela Select 30+ and Costa Rica A & B. Venezuela came first in this tournament, Guatemala 2nd, Costa Rica A 3rd, and Costa Rica B 4th. The team was again captained by Josh Macy.

Nationally, there are about 10 clubs in Guatemalas. While the national league collaborates with the Salvadorian team and two others, it's called the Binacional League.

Record

Overall
Below is a table of the representative rugby matches played by a Guatemala national XV at test level up until

External links and references
  [http://www.rugbyguatemala.com/ Rugby Guatemala
  Guatemala Rugby Club 
  Guatemala Quetzal Rugby Club
  Rugby Guatemala
 Guatemala's rugby story
 Jose Macy

Rugby union in Guatemala
Central American national rugby union teams
Rugby union